The 73rd Group Army , Unit 73111), formerly the 31st Group Army, is a military formation of the Chinese People's Liberation Army Ground Forces (PLAGF). The 73rd Group Army is one of thirteen total group armies of the PLAGF, the largest echelon of ground forces in the People's Republic of China, and one of three assigned to the nation's Eastern Theater Command. Headquartered in Xiamen, Fujian, the unit's primary mission is likely preparation for conflict in or about the Taiwan Strait.

History
The 31st Group Army traces its lineage to the Shantung Column of the Shantung Military Region which was formed around 1941. By 1945 the column had been reorganized and redesignated into several military districts, including the Chiao-Tung Military District. By 1946, elements of the Chiao-Tung MD were reorganized and redesignated 9th and 13th Columns. The 13th Column, commanded by Chou Chih-chien was composed of three divisions, including the 37th, 38th, and 39th. In the mid-to-late 1940s the 13th Column was reorganized and redesignated as the 31st Corps, also commanded by Chou Chih-chien. The 31st Corps was composed of the 91st, 92nd and 93rd Divisions.  In late 1949 the 31st Corps, under the 10th bingtuan (Army or "Army Group"), took part in the Chekiang and Fukien Campaign conducting operations against or near Nanp'ing, Kut'ien and the Changchou-Amoy area.

During the Korean War the 31st Corps was one of the few units to remain in China opposite Taiwan to defend against a potential US-Taiwan Invasion. The 31st was stationed in Fujian.  In 1958, elements of the 31st Group Army took part in the artillery bombardment of Kinmen (Quemoy) and the Matsu Islands that precipitated the Second Taiwan Strait Crisis.

21st century
The 31st Army Group is currently one of the three army groups assigned to the Nanjing Military Region.

From mid-July 1991 to May 1992 elements of the 31st Group Army conducted a variety of exercises and operations in the Nanjing Military Region according to the Chinese Council of Advanced Politics. In mid-July 1991 in the Longhai area of Fujian Province, a regiment from the 91st Division conducted routine training and armed swimming training in an effort to improve the unit's amphibious warfare capability.  Also in July 1991, the reconnaissance battalion of the 86th Infantry Division along with soldiers from the Zhugong area conducted similar training in the Xiaocheng and Dacheng areas Lianjiang Xian, Fujian Province.

In early October 1991 the 258th Regiment of the 86th Motorized Infantry Division, along with units from various military sub-districts, conducted defensive exercises and combined militia exercises in the Banding Area, Lianjiang Xian, Fujian Province.  In mid October to early November 1991 the 92nd and 93rd Infantry Divisions (since disbanded) of the 31st Group Army conducted routine training and field training activities in the Fuzhou area of Changpu and Nanan.  In early April 1992 the signal corps of the 31st Signal Regiment conducted routine training and an overall signal training and evaluation between veterans and replacements in Xiamen, Fujian Province.

Elements of the 31st Group Army took part in Exercise 96-1, the military exercises that took place in the Taiwan Straits in 1996.

The 73rd Group Army appears to comprise six combined-arms maneuver brigades, one of which is heavy (armored), two medium (mechanized, two are amphibious) and two light (motorized) and each of which lead four combined-arms battalions. These combined arms brigades are the PLAGF's basic operational unit, likely following the United States' and later Russia's transition from division-centric warfare to brigade-centric warfare. The 73rd Group Army also commands six combat support brigades.

Since 2017, the 73rd Group Army commands the following subordinate units.

 3rd Light Combined-Arms Brigade
 14th Amphibious Combined-Arms Brigade (ZTD-05, ZBD-05)
 86th Heavy Combined-Arms Brigade (ZTZ-96A, ZBD-04)
 91st Amphibious Combined-Arms Brigade (ZTD-05, ZBD-05)
 92nd Light Combined-Arms Brigade
 145th Medium Combined-Arms Brigade (ZTL-11, ZSL-92)
 73rd Special Operations Brigade
 73rd Army Aviation Brigade (Mi-17, Z-8, Z-9, Z-10, Z-19)
 73rd Artillery Brigade
 73rd Air Defense Brigade
 73rd Engineering and Chemical Defense Brigade
 73rd Support Services Brigade

References 

Field armies of the People's Liberation Army
Eastern Theater Command
Military units and formations established in 2017